Joseph Corrodon Kingsbury (1812–1898) was a Mormon pioneer and local-level leader in the Church of Jesus Christ of Latter-day Saints (LDS Church).

Kingsbury was a native of Enfield, Connecticut. He joined the Church of Christ in 1832 while living in the household of Newel K. Whitney in Ohio. In 1836, he married Whitney's daughter Caroline. Caroline died in 1842 and shortly after that Kingsbury left to serve a mission in New England.

In March 1845, he married Dorcas Moore (who would be the mother of future University of Utah President Joseph T. Kingsbury). In 1846, with Dorcas's consent, he polygamously married Stillman Pond's daughter Loenza, who would be the mother of Mariah Loenza Kingsbury, a wife of Apostle Marriner W. Merrill and mother of Apostle Joseph F. Merrill. As "sister wives," Dorcas and Loenza enjoyed a close relationship until Loenza's death in 1853 from "consumption," likely pneumonia. Dorcas died in 1869 from complications in childbirth, leaving Kingsbury widowed for a third time.

Kingsbury came to the Salt Lake Valley in 1847. From 1851 to 1854 he was bishop of the 2nd Ward in Salt Lake City. In 1883 he was ordained a patriarch. In 1870, Kingsbury married his fourth wife, English native Eliza Mary Partridge.

Kingsbury was a farmer in Weber County for several years. From 1858 on he worked in the tithing store in Salt Lake City.

In 1985, a biography of Kingsbury by Lyndon W. Cook was published by Grandin Books in Provo, Utah.

References

Overland Trails biography of Kingsbury
Handwritten journal of Joseph C. Kingsbury

Mormon pioneers
American leaders of the Church of Jesus Christ of Latter-day Saints
Patriarchs (LDS Church)
1812 births
1888 deaths
American Mormon missionaries in the United States
19th-century Mormon missionaries
People from Salt Lake City
People from Weber County, Utah
Latter Day Saints from Connecticut
Latter Day Saints from Ohio
Latter Day Saints from Utah
People from Enfield, Connecticut